{{Infobox ragam
| name          = Poornachandrika
| synonym       =
| image_name    =
| image_alt     =
| mela          =
| chakra        =
| type          =
| arohanam      = 
| avarohanam    = | jeeva         =
| chhaya        =
| nyasa         =
| vishesha      =
| equivalent    =
| similar       =
}}
Poornachandrika' is a raga in Carnatic music, classical music of South India. It is a janya raga of Shankarabharanam, 29th in the 72 Melakarta ragas.

Structure and Lakshana
Its arohana-avarohana structure is as follows:Arohana: Avarohana: 

Popular Compositions
 Panchanadeesha Pahimaam and Ne Jesina by Patnam Subramania Iyer
 Telisi Rama by Tyagaraja
 Palukavemi Na by Tyagaraja
 Shanku Chakra by Muthuswami Dikshitar
 Varadanipuna by G.N. Balasubramaniam
 Sri Rajarajeshwari by Muthuswami Dikshitar
 Sri Ranganatham Upasmahe by Muthuswami Dikshitar
 Palaya mam deva'' by Swati Tirunal

Notes

References

Janya ragas